A cold case is an unsolved crime no longer being investigated.

Cold Case (2003–2010) and Cold Case Files (1999–2017) were American TV series.

Cold Case may also refer to:

 "Cold Case" (Sue Thomas: F.B.Eye), television episode
 "Cold Case" ('Til Death), television episode
 "Cold Case" (The Whole Truth), television episode
 A Cold Case, a novel by Philip Gourevitch
 Cold Case (film), a 2021 Malayalam language film